Navaratna is a Sanskrit compound word meaning "nine gems" or "ratnas". Jewellery created in this style has important cultural significance in many southern, and south-eastern Asian cultures as a symbol of wealth, status, and also as having other claimed talismanic benefits to health and wellbeing. The setting of the stones is believed to hold mystical powers, tied to astrology, mythology and intrinsically linked to the Indian religions of Hinduism, Jainism and Buddhism. The historic origin of the significance behind the nine gems has proved impossible to trace but is tied to mythological concepts around cosmology and astrology and the "Navagrahas", or "nine celestial gods".

The stones are often set within gold or silver jewellery with a ruby as the centrepiece representing the Sun. Each additional stone around the ruby then represents another celestial body within the Solar System, or a node, in addition to representing metaphysical concepts of good fortune, and the characteristics and personalities of religious figures. For traditional purposes and the purported health benefits, the arrangement of the stones and their position to the body is of particular significance, as is the quality of the gemstones.

Navaratna across languages and cultures
The word Navaratna has equivalent translations as below, each culture largely reflects the same core concepts of the values of the stones, and their significance. Some specific settings of the stones hold unique relevance in particular countries however such importance is given to this combination of nine gems that they are recognised as sacred in almost all the countries of Asia, including, India, Nepal, Sri Lanka, Singapore, Myanmar, Cambodia, Vietnam, Indonesia, Thailand and Malaysia, regardless of religious and cultural differences.

Translation of Navaratna
Navaratna in Sinhalese, Sanskrit, Hindi, Marathi, Nepali, Kannada, Burmese, Bengali and Indonesian
Nabaratna (ନବରତ୍ନ) in Odia
Navaratinam in Tamil
Navaratnalu in Telugu
Navaratnam in Malayalam
Nawaratna in Malay
Nawarat or Noppharat in Thai
Nawarat (နဝရတ်) in Burmese

Recognition in Thailand
In Thailand, the Navaratna is officially recognised as a national and royal symbol of the king. A high award given by the king is called "Noppharat Ratchawaraphon" (the Ancient Auspicious Order of the Nine Gems).

The decoration consists of a single class (Knight). The insignia is:
 Pendant of the Nine Gems, on a yellow sash with a red, blue and green trims, worn over the right shoulder of the left hip (for men). For women, the Pendant of the Nine Gems is attached onto a silk ribbon, worn on the front left shoulder.
 Star of the Nine Gems, to wear on the left chest
 Gold Ring of the Nine Gems, for men, to wear on the right ring finger.

Gems and planets
Late Thai astrologer Horacharn Thep Sarikabutr has given the meaning of these nine gems in his Parichad-Jataka (chapter 2, verse 21, page 35–36) translated as follows:
"Top quality and flawless ruby is the gem for the Sun, natural pearl for the Moon, red coral for Mars, emerald for Mercury, yellow sapphire for Jupiter, diamond for Venus, blue sapphire for Saturn, hessonite for Rahu (ascending lunar node), and cat's eye for Ketu (descending lunar node)."

This quote attributed to the Sanskrit "Brihat Jatak" is also quoted in the "Mani-mala" page 575, verse 79 by S.M. Tagore (1879), and also in the ancient "Jataka Parijata," chapter 2, sloka 21 compiled by Sri Vaidyanatha Dikshitar,

and reads in Sanskrit transliterated as follows:

Translation:
 Ruby for Surya (Sun),
 Pearl for Chandra (Moon),
 Red coral for Mangala (Mars),
 Emerald for Budha (Mercury),
 Yellow sapphire for Bṛhaspati (Jupiter),
 Diamond for Shukra (Venus),
 Blue sapphire for Shani (Saturn),
 Hessonite for Rahu (the ascending lunar node)
 Cat's eye for Ketu (the descending lunar node),
"...these gems must be high-born and flawless."

Setting arrangement

The traditional setting and arrangement of these nine gems is shown in the illustration. A ruby (representing the Sun) is always in the center, surrounded (clockwise from the top) by a diamond, a natural pearl, red coral, hessonite, a blue sapphire, cat's eye, a yellow sapphire, and an emerald. This is the same placement as the Nava-graha Yantra.

Traditionally, no gem other than a ruby or a red spinel is set in the center of a nine gems arrangement. To do so is believed to go against the flow of nature. Because the Sun is the center of the solar system, its gem is positioned in the heart of a Navaratna Talisman.

For an example of the navaratna in a necklace setting, see Thailand's "The Queen Sirikit Navaratna."

Navaratna gem purity
In the above sloka the words sujatyam-amalam (sujati=high born, and amala=completely pure or flawless) are significant. According to Asian belief systems, only clean, top-quality gems are considered to be auspicious.

In further support of this mostly overlooked dictate, in the Hindu "Garuda Puranam," chapter 68, verse 17, it is stated by narrator Sri Suta Goswami:
" Pure, flawless gems have auspicious powers which can protect one from demons, snakes, poisons, diseases, sinful reactions, and other dangers, while flawed stones have the opposite effect."

And from the ancient " Agni Purana," chapter 246, slokas 7 and 8:
"A gem free from all impurities and radiating its characteristic internal luster should be looked upon as an escort of good luck; a gem which is cracked, fissured, devoid of luster, or appearing rough or sandy, should not be used at all."

Contemporary ideas on gem therapy by Yogananda in Autobiography of a Yogi
"Just as a house can be fitted with a copper rod to absorb the shock of lightning, so the bodily temple can be benefited by various protective measures. Ages ago our yogis discovered that pure metals emit an astral light which is powerfully counteractive to negative pulls of the planets. Subtle electrical and magnetic radiations are constantly circulating in the universe [...] This problem received attention from our rishis; they found helpful not only a combination of metals, but also of plants and most effective of all faultless jewels of not less than two carats. The preventive uses of astrology have seldom been seriously studied outside of India. One little-known fact is that the proper jewels, metals, or plant preparations are valueless unless the required weight is secured, and unless these remedial agents are worn next to the skin."

Gems in sidereal astrology
According to Hindu astrology, life on earth is influenced by the navagrahas, or nine influencers. The placement of the navagrahas in one's horoscope supposedly have an influence throughout an individual's life. Wearing the nine gems is said to provide an astrological balance and benefit to the wearer. Hindu astrology also says that these gems potentially may have both positive or negative influences on human life, and that astrological gems should be worn only after consulting a Vedic astrologer, who is also conversant with gems. Based on an individual's sidereal horoscope, either a single gem or a combination of compatible gems is advised to be worn to harness beneficial planets or counteract harmful planets. The supposed "astrological" or "piezoelectric" benefit of wearing or donating gems has not been scientifically quantified.

Religions that recognise Navaratna
 Buddhism 
 Hinduism 
 Jainism

References

External links
The Planetary Gemologists Association website

Hindu astrology
Types of jewellery
Magic (supernatural)
Talismans
Superstitions of India
Jewellery of India
Gemstones in religion